The Gesellschaft für Operations Research (GOR) is the professional non-profit society for the scientific field of Operations Research in Germany. The society is a member of the European umbrella organization, the Association of European Operational Research Societies (EURO), and of the International Federation of Operational Research Societies (IFORS).

History 
The history of the present-day society began in 1956 with the foundation of the Working Group Operations Research (Arbeitskreis Operations Research, AKOR) which was fairly practically orientated. In 1961, the German Society for Operations Research (Deutsche Gesellschaft für Unternehmensforschung, DGU) with a rather academic background was founded. Both societies merged in 1972 and became the German Operations Research Society (Deutsche Gesellschaft für Operations Research, DGOR).

By the end of the 1970s some members with a theoretical focus did not find anymore their interests enough represented by the rather practical DGOR. Hence, they founded the Society for Mathematics, Economics and Operations Research (Gesellschaft für Mathematik, Ökonomie und Operations Research, GMÖOR) in 1979. From 1995 on, they again realized common conferences. On January 1, 1998 both societies joined for today's Society for Operations Research (Gesellschaft für Operations Research, GOR).

Governance 
The society's affairs are managed by an executive board of four members, including the president. Its affairs are overseen by an advisory board consisting of fifteen members. Both institutions are elected every second year. For administrative work the society maintains a secretary.

Membership 
Currently (2014), the society has about 1200 members - individuals and institutions from academia, industry and administration.

Publications 
Beside their member journal "OR News" the German OR Society publishes with Springer two scientific journals: Operations Research Spectrum (OR Spectrum)  and Mathematical Methods of Operations Research (MMOR). Additionally, a monthly newsletter is distributed to the members.

Conferences 
Once a year, the German OR Society organizes a national conference, attended by 500 to 900 participants. 
The society maintains strong relations with the Austrian Society of Operations Research (Österreichische Gesellschaft für Operations Research, ÖGOR), the Swiss Association for Operations Research (Schweizerische Vereinigung für Operations Research, SVOR), therefore every four years the conference is a joint one with ÖGOR and SVOR.
At irregular intervals common conferences with the Dutch Society for Operations Research (Nederlandse Genootschap voor Besliskunde, NGB) are organized.
In addition to the yearly conference, the society's working groups meet about once a year.

Working groups 

Within the German Society for Operations Research fifteen working groups are constituted:
 Analytics
 Decision Theory and Practice
 Finance and Financial Institutions
 Fuzzy Systems, Neural Networks and Artificial Intelligence
 Healthcare Management
 Logistics and Transportation
 OR and Environment 
 OR in Engineering Science
 Real World Mathematical Optimization
 Pricing & Revenue Management
 Forecasting Methods and Applications
 Project Management and Scheduling
 Simulation and Optimization of Complex Systems
 Supply Chain Management
 Information Systems

The working groups organize regular workshops in which experts from economy, administration, consulting companies and academia meet and discuss current topics. The working groups usually get together once or twice a year, often in cooperation with a company.

Prizes 
The GOR awards different prizes on its yearly conference: A respective jury elects yearly up to four winners of the GOR Master Thesis Award and the GOR Dissertation Award. Every second year the society honors one person for his or her lifetime achievement with the GOR Scientific Award and grants the GOR Company Award to an enterprise that commits itself to the application and dissemination of operations research. 
A prize for the best bachelor thesis can be awarded to one student per year by each German academic department.

References

External links
 

Operations research societies
Scientific societies based in Germany
Organizations established in 1998